Darb-e Gonbad District is a district (bakhsh) in Kuhdasht County, Lorestan Province, Iran. At the 2006 census, its population was 13,017, in 2,609 families.  The District has one city: Darb-e Gonbad.  The District contains two Rural Districts: Darb-e Gonbad Rural District and Boluran Rural District.

References 

Districts of Lorestan Province
Kuhdasht County